General elections were held in Italy on 27 January 1861, with a second round on 3 February. The newly elected Parliament first convened in Turin on 4 March 1861, where, thirteen days later, it declared the unification of the country as the Kingdom of Italy.

The elections were carried out according to the 1848 electoral law of the Kingdom of Sardinia, in which only literate men over the age of 25 and paying a certain level of taxation were allowed to vote. Candidates were elected in single member constituencies, with a second round required in cases when no candidates received over 50% of the vote or the equivalent of one-third of the registered voters in the constituency. The Pope demanded that Catholics did not take part in the elections.

Electoral campaign
The Historical Right was led by the former Prime Minister of the Kingdom of Sardinia, Camillo Benso, Count of Cavour, a long-time statesman and a leading figure in the movement toward Italian unification.

On the other hand, the bloc of the Historical Left was led by Urbano Rattazzi, a liberal politician who was among the founders of the Italian left-wing parliamentary group.

In opposition to the two main blocs there were a third party known as The Extreme, a far-left coalition, under the leadership of Giuseppe Mazzini, an Italian revolutionary and a key figure of the Unification.

Only 418,696 men of a total population of around 22 million were entitled to vote. Right-wing candidates emerged as the largest bloc in Parliament with around 43% of the 443 seats. They were largely aristocrats representing rentiers from the north of the country, and held moderate political views including loyalty to the crown and low government spending. The right-wing leader Camillo Benso di Cavour was elected as the first Prime Minister in the history of Italy.

Parties and leaders

Results

References

General elections in Italy
Italy
General
Italy
Italy